Euthria vokesi is a species of sea snail, a marine gastropod mollusc in the family Buccinidae, the true whelks.

Description
The length of the shell attains 31.7 mm.

Distribution
This species occurs in the Indian Ocean off Somalia.

References

 Fraussen K.T. & Garcia E.F. 2008. A new and unique Euthria (Gastropoda: Buccinidae) from Somalia. Gloria Maris, 47(3): 48-52

Endemic fauna of Somalia
Buccinidae
Gastropods described in 2008